The Cook Islands national basketball team is the team that represents the Cook Islands in international basketball and is a member of FIBA Oceania.

Roster
At the 2018 FIBA Polynesia Basketball Cup:

References

2007 Cook Islands National Basketball Team information

Men's national basketball teams
Basketball